V Crucis is a carbon star in the constellation Crux. A Mira variable, its apparent magnitude ranges from 8.7 to 11.1 over ays. The fact that this star's period is nearly equal to one year makes it hard to get good observational coverage over the entire cycle. Its  near-infrared light curve shows a contribution from the first harmonic of the fundamental period.

References

Crux (constellation)
Crucis, V
CD-57 4791
112319
063175
Mira variables
Carbon stars
J12563556-5753569
IRAS catalogue objects
Emission-line stars